The Pro Co "The RAT" is a distortion pedal produced by Pro Co Sound. The original RAT was developed in the basement of Pro Co's Kalamazoo, Michigan facility in 1978. Numerous variations of the original RAT pedal are still being produced today.

The pedal has changed in appearance over the years, but its tone has remained largely the same. Pro Co has also introduced variations of the RAT, including the Turbo RAT and the You Dirty RAT, among others.

History
The origins of the Pro Co "The RAT" can be traced back to the mid-1970s, when Pro Co engineers, Scott Burnham and Steve Kiraly repaired and hot-rodded existing distortion pedals, such as the Dallas Arbiter Fuzz Face. Burnham decided he could build a superior product from the ground up, and designed "The RAT" pedal.

In 1978, "The RAT" was being built as a custom-order product. Only twelve of these pedals (including one prototype), commonly referred to as the "Bud Box" RAT, were produced. Each pedal was built in a standard project box, hand painted, and hand drilled. In 1979, Pro Co began mass-producing them. This iteration was built in a custom designed, rectangular sheet-metal enclosure, with an L shaped removable top/back section giving access to the internals. The top panel was labeled with Pro Co Sound "The RAT" and the three control knobs as Distortion, Tone and Volume.

In 1983, Pro Co switched to a smaller, U-shaped enclosure. Finally, in 1988, the RAT2 was introduced, which included an on/off LED. Various RAT2 circuit board layouts and wiring configurations have surfaced in the last few years, including the noted "RAT3 version A and B" all under the RAT2 moniker. The RAT2 model is still available today, but in 2008 production moved to China and is now manufactured by Neutrik for Pro Co Sound.

Other models of RAT products include:

 R2DU (1984-1988)
 Juggernaut (original) (1979-1981)
 RAT2 (1988–present)
 Turbo RAT (1989–present)
 Vintage RAT Reissue (1991-2005)
 BRAT / Roadkill (1997-2001)
 Deucetone RAT (2002–present)
 Juggernaut (reissue) (2003–present)
 25th Silver Anniversary RAT (2003)
 You Dirty RAT (2004–present)
 SOLO (2006–present)
 '85 Whiteface RAT Reissue (2010)

Circuitry 

The Pro Co "The RAT" is a distortion pedal with a quite simple circuit, which can be broken down into four simpler blocks: distortion stage, tone control, output stage and power supply.

The design is based around a single opamp, originally the Motorola LM308 (switched to Texas Instruments OP07DP around 2002-2003). The distortion is produced using a variable gain circuit with diodes shorting the output to ground at a certain voltage level to produce hard clipping of the input waveform. Originally, 1N914 diodes were used, which were later replaced with 1N4148 since RAT2. The 'Turbo RAT' pedal uses red LEDs for this purpose (red LEDs have about a twice as high forward voltage as the original silicon diodes), while the 'You Dirty RAT' pedal uses 1N34A germanium diodes (clipping at a lower forward voltage). The distortion stage is followed by a passive 'reverse' tone filter and volume control.

The general design is very similar to the Boss DS-1 distortion pedal. A major difference is the opamp used (the LM308). Known for its poor slew rate, it largely accounts for the sonic difference between the two pedals.

Versions of the RAT

Current product line
 RAT2 (Silicon clipping diodes)
 Turbo RAT (Red LED clipping diodes)
 You Dirty RAT (Germanium clipping diodes)
 FAT RAT (Silicon / MOSFET / Germanium clipping diodes mode, 'Thick' switch (treble cut), 9/18V and a swappable opamp)
 Deucetone RAT (Dual RAT (2-in-1) pedal (separate In / Out jacks per side), Side A Silicon / LED / Germanium clipping diodes mode, Side B Silicon / LED / Diode lift clipping diode mode)
 Juggernaut (Reissue version)

Non-RAT moniker pedals currently produced by ProCo
 Solo (Three asymmetric clipping diode pairs modes (Hot / Melt / Burn), Scoop control (Midrange), Tone (instead of typical 'reverse' Filter tone control), Texas Instruments OP07DP opamp. The prototype was called "RATZO" and featured a center placed dual-gang pot for 'Tone' & 'Scoop' controls along with the 'Distortion' and 'Volume' controls in typical RAT fashion)

Discontinued products
 "Bud Box" RAT (The original handbuilt RAT)
 "Big Box" RAT (Distinct big rectangular box pedal)
 Juggernaut (also called "Bass RAT") (Original version) (modified RAT circuit with 'Low Pass' filtering in place, Dual (2-in-1) RAT size enclosure, Right side: 'Mix' (between Drive / Clean ratio), Master Volume and on the Left side: Amount (Drive), Tone, Vol. The pedal also features an external effects loop)
 "Small Box" RAT (Bent steel U-shape enclosure)
 R2DU (19 inch rackmountable double RAT pedal, usable in cascade mode or dual channel)
 BRAT / Roadkill ('budget' USA-made RAT2 derivative circuit including the Motorola LM308 opamp with the negative-feedback loop lifted. The front faceplate is two-sided with one 'BRAT' print side and on the other side a 'Roadkill' print. Note, this pedal is 9 V battery fed only)
 Vintage RAT Reissue (rectangular shaped "Big Box" reissue model)
 '85 Whiteface RAT Reissue (Limited run '10)

Special Runs
 IKEBE 40th Anniversary: All-white RAT2 pedal with black lettering, white knobs and a bright blue LED (Japan only model).
 25th year Silver Anniversary Rat: "Big Box" pedal in a distinct silver coloured stainless steel enclosure with the tagline "25 years of Grunge" (Limited anniversary model, handed out to select artists and technicians by Pro Co sound).

Popular modifications to the RAT
The RAT is a popular pedal for modifying. Some of the possible modifications include:

 Resistor Mods: The Ruetz RAT mod which involves simply cutting the 47 Ω resistor to disengage half of the drive circuit. Gain is reduced somewhat and the bass is no longer attenuated. Additionally, the 560 Ω resistor controlling the lower half of the distortion filter can receive similar treatment. Either mod will translate to a thicker (fuzz like) bass response at the expense of losing distortion.
 Toggle Switches: The Mightier Mouse mod involves a 3-way switch to select between RAT / RAT2 (clipping via silicon diodes), Turbo RAT (clipping via red LEDs), and FAT RAT (MOSFET clipping) modes. It also shows an alternative to the Ruetz RAT mod by using a potentiometer or trimpot to replace the resistor instead of cutting it out of the circuit.
 Diode Lift: Removing one of the two (asymmetric clipping) or both (pure opamp clipping) clipping diodes results in a volume boost with a crunchier tone.
 Chip Substitutions: The original RAT pedals featured the rare Motorola LM308 opamp, which is now quite expensive to acquire. Recent RAT2 pedals nowawadays feature the widely available Texas Instruments OP07DP. Other opamps that people try, include: the CA3130EZ (MOSFET-based), the NE5535A / NE5534AP (high slew rate, low noise), the LM741 (low drive) and finally the TL071 / TL081 (both BI-FET based). Many RAT modders install an opamp socket to enable easy swapping of opamps, which is similar to what people do with the Ibanez Tube Screamer circuit.
 Capacitor Mods: "softening" ceramic caps replaced with silver mica or metal film caps for better tonal fidelity. These include the 30 pF cap riding the opamp chip and the single 100 pF cap.
 Power Jack: 2.1 mm (Roland / BOSS-style) 9 V DC adapter socket mod. Because the tip on the BOSS-style adapter is negative, one needs to install a plastic 2.1 mm socket to avoid shorting out the barrel of the plug against the RAT's steel chassis (note, the official website says it uses a positive tip adapter).

Clones
Because of the RAT's popularity, numerous large and small pedal designers and manufacturers have attempted to replicate its sound as 'clones' or in new designs. Often the goal of these 'clones' is to capture the sound of vintage RATS at a more affordable price point. Many RAT clones allow users to switch between the different RAT circuits (Turbo, standard, etc) or between eras (Whiteface, LM308 Chip, Big box...). The simplicity of the circuit has also made it popular among pedal-kit manufacturers for first-time builders. Some examples of RAT 'clones' are:

Notable users

References

External links
 Pro Co Sound Official RAT Distortion
 Pro Co Sound
 Rat History
 Rat Circuit Differences

Effects units